David W. Dickinson (June 10, 1808 – April 27, 1845) was an American politician who represented Tennessee's eighth district in the United States House of Representatives.

Biography
Dickinson, the son of David Dickinson and Fanny Noailles Murfree, was born June 10, 1808 in Franklin, Tennessee. After completing preparatory studies, he graduated from the University of North Carolina at Chapel Hill. He studied law, was admitted to the bar, and practiced law. Dickinson married Eliza A. Grantland, in Milledgeville, Georgia, on December 8, 1835. Eliza died in 1838. His second marriage was to Sallie Brickell Murfree, who was born in September 1821.  
.

Career
Dickinson was elected as a Jacksonian to the Twenty-third Congress, which lasted from March 4, 1833 to March 4, 1835, and as a Whig to the Twenty-eighth Congress, which lasted from March 4, 1843 to March 4, 1845.

Death
Unable to attend the last session of Congress due to his failing health, he died at "Grantland," his father's home, near Murfreesboro, Tennessee on April 27, 1845 (age 36 years, 321 days). He is interred at the family burying ground at the estate. He was the nephew & son-in-law of U.S. Representative William Hardy Murfree.

References

External links

1808 births
1845 deaths
People from Franklin, Tennessee
Jacksonian members of the United States House of Representatives from Tennessee
Whig Party members of the United States House of Representatives from Tennessee
19th-century American politicians